The Exchange may refer to:

Buildings

England
 The Exchange, Birmingham, former building in Birmingham
 The Exchange, Bristol, a historic building
 The Exchange, Twickenham, a theatre and arts venue in the London Borough of Richmond upon Thames
 Exchange Arcade, the commercial section of the Nottingham Council House
 The Exchange, a sister venue of the Hazlitt Theatre in Kent, England
 The Exchange, a building project in Croydon, a neighborhood in south London
 The Exchange, a contemporary art gallery in Penzance, Cornwall

Elsewhere
 The Exchange (Dubai), a 29-floor tower
 The Exchange (La Plata, Maryland)
 The Exchange, a shopping mall owned by CapitaLand in Tianjin, China

Arts and entertainment
 The Exchange (novel), a 1969 novella by Yuri Trifonov
 The Exchange, a non-fiction book by Allan Levine
 The Exchange (1952 film), a West German comedy film
 The Exchange (2011 film), an Israeli film
 The Exchange (2021 film), a comedy-drama film
 The Exchange (band), an a cappella band from the US
 The Exchange (TV series), a Canadian financial news television program
 The Exchange, a recording studio in London where several Depeche Mode albums, including Ultra, were recorded

Other uses
 Army and Air Force Exchange Service
 The Exchange (Canada), an interbank ATM network
 The exchange (chess), an occurrence in the game of chess

See also
 Exchange (disambiguation)